This is a list of electoral results for the electoral district of Balcatta in Western Australian state elections.

Members for Balcatta

Election results

Elections in the 2020s

Elections in the 2010s

Elections in the 2000s

Elections in the 1990s

Elections in the 1980s

Elections in the 1970s

Elections in the 1960s 

 Two party preferred vote was estimated.

Elections in the 1900s

References

Western Australian state electoral results by district